Jiuming Qiyuan (C: 九命奇冤, P: Jiǔmìng Qíyuān, W: Chiu-ming ch'i-yüan, "The Strange Case of Nine Murders") is a murder mystery novel by Wu Jianren (Wu Woyao). The novel, as of 1982, is not available in English.

Plot

The novel opens within an action scene, where a group of men trying to burn their victim are engaged in a conversation. Bruce Doar, who wrote a book review of The Chinese Novel at the Turn of the Century, wrote that "Such an opening was unprecedented in Chinese fiction."

Analysis
Gilbert Fong, the author of "Time in Nine Murders: Western Influence and Domestic Tradition", published in The Chinese Novel at the Turn of the Century, documented shifts in time. Fong argued that the manipulation received inspiration from foreign models, Cantonese ballads, and traditional Chinese crime stories (gongan). Fong also stated that the "time inversion" technique appears more often than the previous literature about Jiuming Qiyuan indicates. Robert E. Hegel, author of a book review of The Chinese Novel at the Turn of the Century, wrote that Fong corrected an opinion about Jiuming Qiyuan that had been written by Hu Shih. Doar wrote that Fong's writing was "an especially solid piece of scholarship."

Reception
Bruce Doar, who wrote a book review of The Chinese Novel at the Turn of the Century, stated that Jiuming Qiyuan was "regarded as one of the finest novels of the late Qing period." Doar argued that "due to the opening, it was "one of the most innovative" novels.

References
 Doar, Bruce. "The Chinese Novel at the Turn of the Century" (book review). The Australian Journal of Chinese Affairs, ISSN 0156-7365, 01/1982, Issue 7, pp. 199 - 201 (Available on JSTOR)
 Hegel, Robert E. "The Chinese Novel at the Turn of the Century" (book review). Chinese Literature: Essays, Articles, Reviews (CLEAR), ISSN 0161-9705, 07/1983, Volume 5, Issue 1/2, pp. 188 - 191.
 Yee, Cordell D. K. "The Chinese Novel at the Turn of the Century" (book review). Journal of Asian Studies, ISSN 0021-9118, 05/1982, Volume 41, Issue 3, p. 574

Notes

Further reading

 Fong, Gilbert. "Time in Nine Murders: Western Influence and Domestic Tradition" in: Doleželová-Velingerová, Milena (editor). The Chinese Novel at the Turn of the Century (Toronto: University of Toronto Press; January 1, 1980), 9780802054739.

20th-century Chinese novels
1906 novels
Novels set in Guangdong
Novels by Wu Jianren